Heterusia is a genus of moths in the family Geometridae first described by Jacob Hübner in 1827–31. The genus is confined to the Americas.

Species

References

External links
 With images.

Stamnodini
Geometridae of South America
Moths of South America